{{DISPLAYTITLE:Rho2 Cancri}}

Rho2 Cancri (ρ2 Cancri) is a solitary, yellow-hued star in the constellation Cancer. With an apparent visual magnitude of 5.22, it is visible to the naked eye on a dark night. Based upon an annual parallax shift of 6.70 mas as seen from Earth, this star is located around 490 light-years from the Sun. At that distance, the visual magnitude is diminished by an extinction factor of 0.06 due to interstellar dust.

At the age of about 234 million years, is an evolved, G-type giant star with a stellar classification of G8 III. It has an estimated 3.6 times the mass of the Sun and has expanded to 24 times the Sun's radius.

References

G-type giants
Cancri, Rho2
Cancer (constellation)
BD+28 1666
Cancri, 58
076219
043834
3540